The 1971–72 Seattle SuperSonics season was the 5th season of the Seattle SuperSonics in the National Basketball Association (NBA). In their third season with Lenny Wilkens as head coach, the Sonics finished the regular season in sixth place in the Western Conference with a 47–35 record, their first winning record in franchise history. Wilkens quit as head coach at the end of the season and was replaced by former Dallas Chaparrals coach Tom Nissalke.

Offseason
With the sixth overall pick in the 1971 NBA draft, Seattle selected Fred Brown from the University of Iowa. After months of negotiation (the Kentucky Colonels of the American Basketball Association also selected him in the 1971 ABA Draft), the Sonics signed him to a multi-year contract Brown would go on to have a career spanning 13 seasons with the SuperSonics.

The Buffalo Braves selected Spencer Haywood with the 30th overall pick and intended to claim rights to the player from the SuperSonics. Matters were taken to court, with the judge ruling in favor of the Seattle franchise. Tensions prior to the trial rose to the point that Buffalo decided to pay expansion fees to every team in the league with the exception of the Sonics.

Draft picks

Note: only draft picks who participated in at least one game in the NBA are listed.

The Seattle SuperSonics signed their second round pick Jim McDaniels in February 1972. Since McDaniels was under contract with the Carolina Cougars of the American Basketball Association, both teams began a legal battle over the player's contract, with a judge in the King County Superior Court granting permission to McDaniels to play for the Sonics. The Cougars appealed to the Washington Supreme Court but McDaniels stayed in Seattle.

Roster

Depth chart

Regular season

Season standings

Record vs. opponents

Game log

|- bgcolor=#cfc
| 1
| October 12
| @ Buffalo
| W 123–90
| Spencer Haywood (29)
|
|
| Seattle Center Coliseum10,723
| 1–0
|- bgcolor=#cfc
| 2
| October 15
| @ Portland
| W 119–88 
| Spencer Haywood, Lenny Wilkens (23)
|
|
| Memorial Coliseum6,124
| 2–0
|- bgcolor=#fcc
| 3
| October 16
| Milwaukee
| L 91–98 
| Spencer Haywood (23)
|
|
| Seattle Center Coliseum13,100
| 2–1
|- bgcolor=#cfc
| 4
| October 19
| @ Cincinnati
| W 101–100 
| Dick Snyder (24)
|
|
| Cincinnati Gardens2,967
| 3–1
|- bgcolor=#fcc
| 5
| October 20
| @ Philadelphia
| L 93–100 
| Don Kojis (18)
|
|
| The Spectrum10,365
| 3–2
|- bgcolor=#cfc
| 6
| October 22
| Houston
| W 110–91 
| Spencer Haywood (23)
|
|
| Seattle Center Coliseum10,182
| 4–2
|- bgcolor=#cfc
| 7
| October 24
| Cincinnati
| W 119–101 
| Spencer Haywood (23)
|
|
| Seattle Center Coliseum10,318
| 5–2
|- bgcolor=#cfc
| 8
| October 28
| Buffalo
| W 106–96
| Barry Clemens (26)
|
|
| Seattle Center Coliseum 5,816
| 6–2
|- bgcolor=#cfc
| 9
| October 30
| Los Angeles
| W 115–106 
| Don Kojis (26)
|
|
| Seattle Center Coliseum13,138
| 7–2

|- bgcolor=#fcc
| 10
| November 4
| @ Golden State
| L 96–98 
| Spencer Haywood (31)
|
|
| Oakland–Alameda County Coliseum Arena5,814
| 7–3
|- bgcolor=#cfc
| 11
| November 5
| New York
| W 101–97 
| Lenny Wilkens (26)
|
|
| Seattle Center Coliseum12,638
| 8–3
|- bgcolor=#fcc
| 12
| November 7
| Golden State
| L 102–109 
| Spencer Haywood (32)
|
|
| Seattle Center Coliseum13,197
| 8–4
|- bgcolor=#cfc
| 13
| November 11
| Cleveland
| W 110–91 
| Spencer Haywood (20)
|
|
| Seattle Center Coliseum5,808
| 9–4
|- bgcolor=#fcc
| 14
| November 12
| @ Los Angeles
| L 107–115 
| Spencer Haywood (26)
|
|
| The Forum16,550
| 9–5
|- bgcolor=#cfc
| 15
| November 13
| Boston
| W 116 112 
| Lenny Wilkens (21)
|
|
| Seattle Center Coliseum12,738
| 10–5
|- bgcolor=#fcc
| 16
| November 16
| @ Chicago
| L 87 95 
| Don Kojis (22)
|
|
| Chicago Stadium8,907
| 10–6
|- bgcolor=#cfc
| 17
| November 17
| @ Atlanta
| W 112–104 
| Spencer Haywood (23)
|
|
| Alexander Memorial Coliseum5,462
| 11–6
|- bgcolor=#fcc
| 18
| November 19
| Milwaukee
| L 107–108 
| Spencer Haywood (36)
|
|
| Seattle Center Coliseum12,914
| 11–7
|- bgcolor=#cfc
| 19
| November 20
| @ Portland
| W 104–100 
| Spencer Haywood (25)
|
|
| Memorial Coliseum6,634
| 12–7 
|- bgcolor=#cfc
| 20
| November 21
| Philadelphia
| W 127–117 
| Don Smith (26)
|
|
| Seattle Center Coliseum10,151
| 13–7
|- bgcolor=#fcc
| 21
| November 25
| Los Angeles
| L 115–139 
| Spencer Haywood (24)
|
|
| Seattle Center Coliseum13,170
| 13–8
|- bgcolor=#cfc
| 22
| November 27
| Detroit
| W 124–102 
| Spencer Haywood (26)
|
|
| Seattle Center Coliseum12,565
| 14–8
|- bgcolor=#fcc
| 23
| November 28
| @ Los Angeles
| L 121–138 
| Spencer Haywood (29)
|
|
| The Forum15,544
| 14–9
|- bgcolor=#cfc
| 24
| November 30
| @ New York
| W 110–109 
| Lenny Wilkens (29)
|
|
| Madison Square Garden18,111
| 15–9

|- bgcolor=#fcc
| 25
| December 1
| @ Philadelphia
| L 98–102 
| Spencer Haywood (36)
|
|
| The Spectrum4,507
| 15–10
|- bgcolor=#cfc
| 26
| December 3
| @ Baltimore
| W 117–106 
| Spencer Haywood (35)
|
|
| Baltimore Civic Center3,480
| 16–10
|- bgcolor=#cfc
| 27
| December 4
| @ Cincinnati
| W 100–98 
| Spencer Haywood (25)
|
|
| Cincinnati Gardens2,643
| 17–10
|- bgcolor=#cfc
| 28
| December 5
| @ Cleveland
| W 99–91 
| Lenny Wilkens (27)
|
|
| Cleveland Arena5,029
| 18–10
|- bgcolor=#fcc
| 29
| December 7
| @ Milwaukee
| L 83–116
| Don Smith (21)
|
|
| Milwaukee Arena 9,061
| 18–11
|- bgcolor=#cfc
| 30
| December 10
| Golden State
| W 105–94 
| Spencer Haywood, Lenny Wilkens (21)
|
|
| Seattle Center Coliseum12,928
| 19–11
|- bgcolor=#fcc
| 31
| December 12
| @ Houston
| L 98–100 
| Dick Snyder (23)
|
|
| Hofheinz Pavilion2,751
| 19–12
|- bgcolor=#cfc
| 32
| December 14
| @ Detroit
| W 103–86 
| Spencer Haywood (31)
|
|
| Cobo Arena3,465
| 20–12
|- bgcolor=#fcc
| 33
| December 15
| @ Boston
| L 100–112 
| Spencer Haywood (20)
|
|
| Boston Garden9,225
| 20–13
|- bgcolor=#fcc
| 34
| December 17
| @ Milwaukee
| L 113–120 
| Spencer Haywood (36)
|
|
| Milwaukee Arena9,360
| 20–14
|- bgcolor=#cfc
| 35
| December 18
| Portland
| W 107–105 
| Spencer Haywood (32)
|
|
| Seattle Center Coliseum7,532
| 21–14
|- bgcolor=#cfc
| 36
| December 19
| Phoenix
| W 130–127 (OT)
| Spencer Haywood (35)
|
|
| Seattle Center Coliseum9,189
| 22–14
|- bgcolor=#fcc
| 37
| December 22
| New York
| L 104–120
| Don Smith (17)
|
|
| Seattle Center Coliseum 11,953
| 22–15
|- bgcolor=#fcc
| 38
| December 25
| @ Phoenix
| L 86–116 
| Lenny Wilkens (19)
|
|
| Arizona Veterans Memorial Coliseum6,565
| 22–16
|- bgcolor=#fcc
| 39
| December 26
| Chicago 
| L 102–103
| Spencer Haywood (26)
|
|
| Seattle Center Coliseum 10,240
| 22–17
|- bgcolor=#fcc
| 40
| December 30
| Los Angeles
| L 106–122 
| Spencer Haywood (34)
|
|
| Seattle Center Coliseum13,106
| 22–18

|- bgcolor=#cfc
| 41
| January 1
| Buffalo
| W 97–83
| Don Smith (23)
|
|
| Seattle Center Coliseum 8,676
| 23–18
|- bgcolor=#fcc
| 42
| January 4
| @ Houston
| L 110–119
| Spencer Haywood, Lee Winfield (22)
|
|
| Hofheinz Pavilion 2,786
| 23–19
|- bgcolor=#cfc
| 43
| January 5
| Atlanta
| W 127–116 
| Lee Winfield (24)
|
|
| Seattle Center Coliseum8,120
| 24–19
|- bgcolor=#cfc
| 44
| January 7
| Cleveland
| W 125–111
| Spencer Haywood (48)
|
|
| Seattle Center Coliseum 8,169
| 25–19
|- bgcolor=#cfc
| 45
| January 9
| Boston
| W 125–119
| Spencer Haywood (33)
|
|
| Seattle Center Coliseum 11,108
| 26–19
|- bgcolor=#cfc
| 46
| January 11
| Houston
| W 141–126
| Spencer Haywood (35)
|
|
| Seattle Center Coliseum6,404
| 27–19
|- bgcolor=#cfc
| 47
| January 13
| Baltimore
| W 112–107
| Spencer Haywood (35)
|
|
| Seattle Center Coliseum 9,868
| 28–19
|- bgcolor=#cfc
| 48
| January 15
| Phoenix
| W 118–110
| Spencer Haywood (34)
|
|
| Seattle Center Coliseum 12,693
| 29–19
|- bgcolor=#fcc
| 49
| January 21
| Phoenix
| L 113–128
| Spencer Haywood (32)
|
|
| Seattle Center Coliseum 12,751
| 29–20
|- bgcolor=#fcc
| 50
| January 23
| New York
| L 99–101
| Dick Snyder (26)
|
|
| Seattle Center Coliseum 12,261
| 29–21
|- bgcolor=#fcc
| 51
| January 25
| @ Milwaukee
| L 91–123
| Spencer Haywood (15)
|
|
| Milwaukee Arena 9,046
| 29–22
|- bgcolor=#cfc
| 52
| January 26
| @ Atlanta
| W 131–119
| Spencer Haywood (28)
|
|
| Alexander Memorial Coliseum 6,249
| 30–22
|- bgcolor=#cfc
| 53
| January 28
| @ Buffalo
| W 104–93
| Don Smith (26)
|
|
| Seattle Center Coliseum 4,589
| 31–22
|- bgcolor=#fcc
| 54
| January 29
| @ New York
| L 106–110
| Spencer Haywood (30)
|
|
| Madison Square Garden 19,588
| 31–23

|- bgcolor=#cfc
| 55
| February 1
| @ Chicago
| W 121–103
| Spencer Haywood (27)
|
|
| Chicago Stadium 7,886
| 32–23
|- bgcolor=#fcc
| 56
| February 2
| Houston
| L 88–111
| Spencer Haywood (27)
|
|
| San Antonio, TX 6,074
| 32–24
|- bgcolor=#cfc
| 57
| February 4
| @ Cleveland
| W 118–112
| Lenny Wilkens (25)
|
|
| Cleveland Arena 3,038
| 33–24
|- bgcolor=#fcc
| 58
| February 6
| @ Boston
| L 123–128
| Spencer Haywood (32)
|
|
| Boston Garden 7,246
| 33–25
|- bgcolor=#cfc
| 59
| February 8
| Houston
| W 127–119
| Spencer Haywood (28)
|
|
| Portland, OR 9,000
| 34–25
|- bgcolor=#cfc
| 60
| February 10
| Cincinnati
| W 118–96
| Spencer Haywood (28)
|
|
| Seattle Center Coliseum 7,523
| 35–25
|- bgcolor=#cfc
| 61
| February 12
| Portland
| W 125–97
| Spencer Haywood (28)
|
|
| Seattle Center Coliseum 11,348
| 36–25
|- bgcolor=#cfc
| 62
| February 13
| @ Portland
| W 127–117 (OT)
| Spencer Haywood (44)
|
|
| Memorial Coliseum6,034
| 37–25
|- bgcolor=#cfc
| 63
| February 16
| Boston
| W 113–112
| Spencer Haywood (26)
|
|
| Seattle Center Coliseum12,120
| 38–25
|- bgcolor=#cfc
| 64
| February 18
| Golden State
| W 110–108
| Lenny Wilkens (30)
|
|
| Seattle Center Coliseum13,097
| 39–25
|- bgcolor=#cfc
| 65
| February 20
| Portland
| W 109–105
| Dick Snyder (28)
|
|
| Seattle Center Coliseum13,115
| 40–25
|- bgcolor=#fcc
| 66
| February 22
| @ Golden State
| L 104–120
| Lenny Wilkens (26)
|
|
| Oakland–Alameda County Coliseum Arena7,063
| 40–26
|- bgcolor=#cfc
| 67
| February 23
| Detroit
| W 97–96
| Spencer Haywood (38)
|
|
| Seattle Center Coliseum8,359
| 41–26
|- bgcolor=#cfc
| 68
| February 26
| Cincinnati
| W 122–106
| Spencer Haywood (38)
|
|
| Seattle Center Coliseum13,089
| 42–26
|- bgcolor=#cfc
| 69
| February 29
| @ Baltimore
| W 118–117 (OT)
| Spencer Haywood (38)
|
|
| Baltimore Civic Center6,187
| 43–26

|- bgcolor=#cfc
| 70
| March 1
| @ Detroit
| W 116–102
| Lenny Wilkens (28)
|
|
| Cobo Arena2,954
| 44–26
|- bgcolor=#cfc
| 71
| March 3
| Chicago
| W 112–103
| Spencer Haywood (35)
|
|
| Seattle Center Coliseum13,005
| 45–26
|- bgcolor=#fcc
| 72
| March 4
| @ Golden State
| L 96–114
| Spencer Haywood (20)
|
|
| Oakland–Alameda County Coliseum Arena13,502
| 45–27
|- bgcolor=#cfc
| 73
| March 5
| Atlanta
| W 112–110
| Lee Winfield (18)
|
|
| Seattle Center Coliseum13,021
| 46–27
|- bgcolor=#fcc
| 74
| March 7
| Baltimore
| L 98–105
| Lenny Wilkens (19)
|
|
| Seattle Center Coliseum12,507
| 46–28
|- bgcolor=#fcc
| 75
| March 9
| Philadelphia
| L 123–128
| Lenny Wilkens (24)
|
|
| Seattle Center Coliseum12,971
| 46–29
|- bgcolor=#fcc
| 76
| March 12
| Milwaukee
| L 99–109
| Gar Heard (17)
|
|
| Seattle Center Coliseum13,129
| 46–30
|- bgcolor=#cfc
| 77
| March 14
| @ Chicago
| W 115–111
| Lee Winfield (38)
|
|
| Chicago Stadium11,910
| 47–30
|- bgcolor=#fcc
| 78
| March 15
| @ Atlanta
| L 96–134
| Lenny Wilkens (17)
|
|
| Alexander Memorial Coliseum5,091
| 47–31
|- bgcolor=#fcc
| 79
| March 17
| @ Baltimore
| L 107–112
| Lee Winfield (29)
|
|
| Baltimore Civic Center4,346
| 47–32
|- bgcolor=#fcc
| 80
| March 19
| @ Philadelphia
| L 100–115
| Lee Winfield (26)
|
|
| The Spectrum9,828
| 47–33
|- bgcolor=#fcc
| 81
| March 25
| @ Phoenix
| L 99–118
| Lee Winfield (28)
|
|
| Arizona Veterans Memorial Coliseum10,189
| 47–34
|- bgcolor=#fcc
| 82
| March 26
| @ Los Angeles
| L 98–124
| Gar Heard (21)
|
|
| The Forum17,505
| 47–35

Player statistics

Awards and records
 Spencer Haywood was selected to the All-NBA First Team and made his first All-Star appearance at the 1972 NBA All-Star Game in Los Angeles.

Injuries
 Spencer Haywood suffered a leg injury at the beginning of March and was out for the season.

Transactions

Overview

Trades

References

Seattle
Seattle SuperSonics seasons